Bridger Jack Butte is a sandstone butte located in Bears Ears National Monument, in San Juan County, Utah, United States. This landmark is situated four miles southeast of the Sixshooter Peaks, and is visible from State Route 211 between Newspaper Rock and the Needles District of Canyonlands National Park. "Bridger Jack" was a Paiute medicine man.

Geology
Bridger Jack Butte is composed of hard, fine-grained Wingate Sandstone, the petrified remains of wind-borne sand dunes deposited approximately 200 million years ago in the Late Triassic. This Wingate Sandstone forms steep cliffs as it overlays softer layers of the Chinle Formation. The next layer below this is the Moenkopi Formation. Precipitation runoff drains into nearby Indian Creek, which is part of the Colorado River drainage basin.

Climbing
Bridger Jack Butte is set in the popular Indian Creek climbing area. The first ascent of Bridger Jack Butte was made June 12, 1983, by Ed Webster, Leonard Coyne, and Ellen Figi, via the Wild Flower route. The "Bridger Jacks" are towers on the connecting ridge between the mesa and the butte. They have names such as "King of Pain", "Hummingbird Spire", "Sunflower Tower", "Easter Island", and "Thumbelina".

Climbing routes on Bridger Jack Butte:
 Wild Flower –  (3 pitches)
 Sparkling Touch – class 5.11
 The Kokanee Corner – class 5.13+
 Hydrophobic coyote – class 5.10-
 Rites of Passage – class 5.11+

Climate 
Spring and fall are the most favorable seasons to visit Bridger Jack Butte. According to the Köppen climate classification system, it is located in a cold semi-arid climate zone, which is defined by the coldest month having an average mean temperature below , and at least 50% of the total annual precipitation being received during the spring and summer.

Gallery

See also
 Geology of the Canyonlands area
 Colorado Plateau

References

External links
 The Bridger Jacks Rock Climbing: Mountainproject.com
 Weather forecast: National Weather Service
 Bridger Jacks aerial video: Vimeo

Landforms of San Juan County, Utah
Sandstone formations of the United States
Colorado Plateau
Bears Ears National Monument
Buttes of Utah
Rock formations of Utah
Climbing areas of the United States
North American 1000 m summits